Ullaskar Dutta (16 April 1885 – 17 May 1965) was an Indian revolutionary associated with Anushilan Samiti and Jugantar of Bengal, and was a close associate of Barindra nath Ghosh.

Early life
Ullaskar was born on 16 April 1885 to a Baidya family in the village of Kalikachha, Sarail, then located under the Brahmanbaria subdivision of the Bengal Province's Tipperah District (present-day Bangladesh). His father Dwijadas Duttagupta was a member of the Brahmo Samaj and had a degree in agriculture from the University of London. After passing entrance examination in 1903, he took admission in the Presidency College, Kolkata and his passion was for the subject Chemistry. However, he was rusticated from the college for hitting a British professor, Professor Russell, who made some derogatory comment about Bengalis.

Revolutionary activities
Ullaskar was a member of the Jugantar party and he became expert in bomb-making. Khudiram Bose used a bomb manufactured by Ullaskar and Hem Chandra Das in an attempt to murder the venerable magistrate, Kingsford. However, police caught many members of the Jugantar group including Ullaskar Dutta, Barindra Ghosh and Khudiram.

Trial and sentence
In the famous Alipore bomb case, Ullaskar was arrested on 2 May 1908 and he was sentenced to death by hanging in 1909. Later, on appeal, the verdict was reduced to transportation for life and he was deported to the Cellular Jail in Andaman.

Cellular jail
Ullaskar was subjected to brutal torture in the Cellular Jail and is said have lost his mental balance. He was set free in 1920 and he returned to Kolkata.

Later life
Ullaskar was again arrested in 1931 and sentenced to 18 months imprisonment. He returned to his home village Kalikachha when colonial rule ended in 1947. After a lonely life of 10 years, he returned to Kolkata in 1957.
After returning to Kolkata he married his childhood friend Lila, daughter of Bipin Chandra Pal at that time she was a physically challenged widow woman and went to Silchar, the district town of Cachar District of Assam and spent his later life there.  He died on 17 May 1965 in Kolkata, West Bengal. Recently, two roads in Kolkata and Silchar were named after him.

Works
 Dvipantarer Katha (The Tale of Deportation)
 Amar Karajiban (translated into English as Twelve Years of Prison Life in 1924).

References

External links
 
 Cellular jail website

Anushilan Samiti
Revolutionaries of Bengal during British Rule
1885 births
1965 deaths
Presidency University, Kolkata alumni
Alumni of the University of London
Anti-British establishment revolutionaries from East Bengal
Brahmos
Indian revolutionaries
Indian prisoners sentenced to death
Prisoners and detainees of British India
Bengali-language writers
Indian independence activists from West Bengal
People from Sarail Upazila